Empire of Gold is a 2013 South Korean television series starring Go Soo, Lee Yo-won, and Son Hyun-joo. It aired on SBS from July 1 to September 17, 2013 on Mondays and Tuesdays at 21:55 for 24 episodes.

Plot
The series is a multi-generational saga that covers a twenty-year span from 1990 to 2010, and follows one chaebol family as it arises out of the ruins of the 1990s IMF financial crisis that wreaked  havoc on the Korean economy, becoming one of the top conglomerates in the nation. Three people become locked in a power struggle for control of this chaebol empire.

Cast
Go Soo as Jang Tae-joo
Jang Tae-joo comes from nothing, and his ambition is fuelled after witnessing the misfortunes of his poor hardworking father. After their father dies, Tae-joo, along with his mother, raises his little sister Hee-joo on his own, and fights tooth and nail to rise to the top relying on his cunning wits. Smart, passionate, and driven, he endures contempt and humiliation as he works relentlessly towards his dreams of success and wealth. But betrayal and exploitation gradually turn him into a cold-hearted, ruthless mogule. He marries Seo-yoon, although he loves Seol-hee.

Lee Yo-won as Choi Seo-yoon
The reserved, aloof and second youngest daughter of the chaebol founder and heiress to the business empire, she and Tae-joo get married, although they both don't love each other.

Son Hyun-joo as Choi Min-jae
Seo-yoon's cousin and Tae-joo's biggest rival for Sungjin Group's top seat. Choi Min-jae is as ruthless, cunning, and unscrupulous as Tae-joo, lobbying, bribing and arranging backdoor deals with the political elite.

Jang Shin-young as Yoon Seol-hee
A woman who uses her looks to garner insider information, sets up a real estate consulting firm to sell what she knows. Even though it's a dangerous job, she teams up with Tae-joo to take down the Choi family and their business empire. She falls in love with Tae-joo.

Ryu Seung-soo as Jo Pil-doo
A mob boss who is the antagonist to Jang Tae-joo's start-up business, and becomes a friend of Tae-joo later.

Park Geun-hyung as Choi Dong-seong
The patriarch and CEO of giant conglomerate Sungjin Group.

Yoon Seung-ah as Jang Hee-joo
Tae-joo's younger sister.

Lee Hyun-jin as Choi Seong-jae
The youngest son of Sungjin Group, whose dream is to become an economist. His family runs the Sungjin Economic Research Institute, where he works.

Sunwoo Eun-sook as Yoo Soon-ok
Tae-joo's mother who took care of her children after her husband died.

Nam Il-woo as Jang Bong-ho
Tae-joo's father who died in an antiquated building  blast without achieving financial blessing.

Kim Mi-sook as Han Jeong-hee
Jung Han-yong as Choi Dong-jin
Um Hyo-sup as Choi Won-jae
Ko Eun-mi as Park Eun-jung
Shin Dong-mi as Choi Jeong-yoon
Jeong Wook as Sohn Dong-hwi
Kim Jeong-hak as Shin Jong-ho
Kim Kang-hyeon as Na Chun-ho
Lee Won-jae as Kim Kwang-se
Choi Yong-min as Park Jin-tae
Park Ji-il as Kang Ho-yeon
Jin Seo-yeon as Jeong Yu-jin
Kwon Tae-won as Jeong Byeong-guk
Dong Ha as Choi Yong-jae

Ratings

Awards and nominations

International broadcast
It began airing in Thailand on digital television MONO29 on May 11, 2015.

References

External links 
 Empire of Gold official SBS website 
 
 

2013 South Korean television series debuts
2013 South Korean television series endings
Seoul Broadcasting System television dramas
Korean-language television shows
South Korean political television series
Television series by Drama House
Television series by Studio S